Hormuj (also Romanized as Hormūj; also known as Hormūj-e Soflá) is a village in Alaviyeh Rural District, Kordian District, Jahrom County, Fars Province, Iran. At the 2006 census, its population was 615, in 149 families.

References 

Populated places in Jahrom County